Maria-sama ga Miteru is an anime television series adapted from the light novel series of the same title by Oyuki Konno and Reine Hibiki. It was broadcast in Japan between January 7 and March 31, 2004, on TV Tokyo. Produced by Studio Deen and directed by Yukihiro Matsushita, the screenplay was written by Reiko Yoshida, and Akira Matsushima based the character design used in the anime on Reine Hibiki's original designs. The art director for the series is Nobuto Sakamoto. The sound director is Yoshikazu Iwanami, and the soundtrack is composed by Mikiya Katakura. The series was later released by Geneon to seven VHS and DVD compilation volumes from April to October 2004. The story follows the lives of a group of teenage girls attending Lillian Catholic school for girls in Tokyo, Japan. A common theme throughout the series revolves around the lives and close relationships of the school's student council known as the Yamayuri Council. These relationships give off a subtle yuri feel which is revealed through the series' character-driven plotline. The first season covered the story from the original light novels up to the sixth volume.

Most of the production staff would return to produce two additional television series and an original video animation (OVA) series. The 13-episode second season, titled , aired between July 4 and September 26, 2004, on TV Tokyo. The series was later released by Geneon to six VHS and DVD compilation volumes from October 2004 to April 2005. It covered the story from the original light novels up to the eleventh volume. The third season, a five-episode OVA series titled Maria-sama ga Miteru, was released on DVD from November 29, 2006, to July 25, 2007; each episode is approximately 50 minutes long. It covered the story from the original light novels up to the seventeenth volume. The 13-episode fourth season, again titled Maria-sama ga Miteru, aired between January 3 and March 28, 2009, on AT-X. The series was released by Geneon to six DVD compilation volumes from March to August 2009. The fourth season is directed by Toshiyuki Katō and the art director is Kazuhiro Itō.

Nozomi Entertainment, the licensing branch of Right Stuf Inc., licensed the three television series and the OVA series under the title Maria Watches Over Us for North American distribution. The four series were released as DVD box sets with English subtitles as follows: July 29, 2008 for season one, November 25, 2008 for season two, March 24, 2009 for season three, and July 6, 2010, for season four. Maiden Japan licensed the three television series and the OVA series after Nozomi Entertainment's license to the franchise had expired.

A set of 29 omake episodes, titled , were released with the DVDs for each of the four seasons. These one- to two-minute long sequences are parodies, featuring super deformed characters performing fake 'outtakes' from the 'filming' of Maria-sama ga Miteru, including the special participation of Yukihiro Matsushita as the voice of the director.

Series overview

Maria-sama ga Miteru (2004)

Maria-sama ni wa Naisho (2004)

Maria-sama ga Miteru: Printemps (2004)

Maria-sama ni wa Naisho (2004-2005)

Maria-sama ga Miteru (2006-2007)

Maria-sama ni wa Naisho (2006-2007)

Maria-sama ga Miteru (2009)

Maria-sama ni wa Naisho (2009)

Notes and references

Maria-sama ga Miteru
Episodes